Howard Books (formerly Howard Publishing) is a Christian publishing company founded in 1969 by Alton Howard and previously based in West Monroe, Louisiana, but which relocated to Brentwood, Tennessee, (south of Nashville) in September 2009. I Howard Books publishes inspirational content.

History

Author and hymn writer, Alton Howard, was very influential in the musical traditions of the churches of Christ since the 1960s.  He started Howard Publishing from his home with a hymnal he titled Songs of the Church. With the success of that hymnal, he went on to publish another hymnal titled Songs of Faith and Praise. It is still in print today and used worldwide.

in 1990, Alton's son, John, took over the company and grew it from a hymnal company to a publishing company that published all genres of works.

In 2006, Howard Publishing was bought by Simon & Schuster.    The company underwent a subtle name change from Howard Publishing to Howard Books. John served as Executive Vice President of Howard Books. He and his team continued to work for the company until 2009 when the company moved to Nashville. Upon the move, Jonathan Merkh was the Executive Vice President and Publisher of Howard Books, in charge of direction and publication.

Howard Books publishes titles on various aspects of Christian living. In addition to Christian bestseller lists, Howard Books has had multiple titles on the New York Times bestseller list by authors such as Karen Kingsbury, various members of Duck Dynasty's Robertson family, Jay Sekulow, Charles Stanley, Allison Pataki, Tim Conway, Dave Ramsey, Frank Peretti, Brad Paisley, Katie Davis, Rick Warren, and Laura Schroff.

For many years Howard Publishing was named The Best Christian Workplace in publishing.

Alton Howard died on October 28, 2006, at the age of 81.

External links 
Official Website of Howard Publishing

References

Publishing companies established in 1969
Book publishing companies based in Tennessee
Christian publishing companies
Christianity in Tennessee
Williamson County, Tennessee
Simon & Schuster